John Griffin (3 January 1930 – 12 December 2005) was a Canadian alpine skier who competed in the 1952 Winter Olympics.

References

1930 births
2005 deaths
Canadian male alpine skiers
Olympic alpine skiers of Canada
Alpine skiers at the 1952 Winter Olympics
20th-century Canadian people